The Malvern Hills are in the English counties of Worcestershire, Herefordshire and a small area of northern Gloucestershire, dominating the surrounding countryside and the towns and villages of the district of Malvern. The highest summit affords a panorama of the Severn Valley, the hills of Herefordshire and the Welsh mountains, parts of thirteen counties, the Bristol Channel, and the cathedrals of Worcester, Gloucester and Hereford.

They are known for their spring water – initially from holy wells, and later the spa town of Great Malvern, which led to the production of the modern bottled drinking water.

The Malvern Hills have been designated as a biological and geological Site of Special Scientific Interest, and by Natural England as National Character Area 103 and an Area of Outstanding Natural Beauty.

Management of the area is the responsibility of the Malvern Hills Trust.

Toponymy
The name Malvern is probably derived from the ancient British moel-bryn, meaning "bare-hill", the nearest modern equivalent being the Welsh moelfryn (bald hill). It has been known as Malferna (11th century), Malverne (12th century), and Much Malvern (16th and 17th centuries).

Jabez Allies, a 19th-century antiquarian from Worcestershire speculated that 'vern' was derived from the British words 'sarn' or 'varn' meaning pavement or seat of judgement.

Geography
The Malvern Hills are part of an Area of Outstanding Natural Beauty, with scenic views over both Herefordshire and Worcestershire. The hills are famous for their natural mineral springs and wells, which were responsible for the development of Great Malvern as a spa in the early 19th century. Malvern water was bottled commercially on a large scale and sold worldwide.

There are three passes over the hills, the Wyche cutting, the A438 road north of Raggedstone Hill and the A449 road just north of the Herefordshire Beacon, the site of the British Camp, an Iron Age hill fort at the top of the hill. The site is thought to date back before the Common Era and has been extended subsequently by a medieval castle. The extensive earthworks remain clearly visible today and determine the shape of the hill.

Geology

The Malvern Hills are formed of some of the most ancient rocks in England, mostly igneous and metamorphic rocks from the late Precambrian, known as the Uriconian, which are around 680 million years old.
The Malvern Line or Malvern Lineament is the name applied to a north–south aligned lineament which runs through the Malvern Hills and extends southwards towards Bristol and northwards past Kidderminster. It consists of a series of faults and folds which have the effect of bringing old Malvernian rocks to the surface. Being largely hard igneous rocks, they have resisted erosion better than those of the surrounding countryside and result in a striking line of hills of which the Malvern Hills are the most impressive. This line is considered to mark the edge of two terranes – two once separate fragments of the Earth's crust now joined as one – the Wrekin Terrane to the west and the Charnwood Terrane to the east.

The main face of Gullet Quarry shows a cross-section through the Precambrian rock and exhibits many rock types including diorite, granite, gneiss, schist, pegmatite and dolerite. The evidence of the complex history of earth movements which formed the Hills can be seen by multiple joints, fractures, faults and shears, which make identifying changes in rock types difficult. Mineral deposits such as haematite, calcite and epidote can be seen within these features.

There is a tiny, man-made cave near the ridge of the hills called Clutter's Cave (or Giant's Cave or Hermit's Cave or Waum's Cave, after Walm's Well which is located on the boundary of News Wood below). The cave has been excavated into pillow lavas. Some of the rounded 'pillow' shapes are still visible around the entrance to the cave.

Malvern water

The quality of Malvern water is attributable to its source. The rocks of the Malvern Hills are amongst the oldest and hardest found in England; the geology is responsible for the quality of Malvern's spring water. The hills consist of Precambrian igneous and metamorphic rock, the oldest of which are about 670 million years old. The rocks are characterised by low porosity and high secondary permeability via fissures. Malvern water is rainwater and snow meltwater that percolates through fissures created by the pressures of tectonic movements about 300 million years ago when advancing sedimentary layers of Silurian shale and limestone were pushed into and under older Precambrian rock. When the fissures are saturated, a water table forms and the water emerges as springs around the fault lines between the strata. The water permeates through the rock which, because of its hardness, leaves little or no mineral traces in the water, while at the same time the very fine cracks act as a filter for other impurities. Rainfall on the Malvern Hills is thought to be sufficient to account for all the water that runs out of the springs, reflected for example in some spring flows six to eight weeks after heavy rainfall, and in reduced flows after a dry period.

Ecology
The Malvern Hills have been designated as a Site of Special Scientific Interest (SSSI) by Natural England and an Area of Outstanding Natural Beauty by the Countryside Agency (now Natural England).

Features of the Malvern Hills AONB include wide areas of acid grassland and heath on the summit and mixed broadleaved woodland and Ancient Semi-Natural Woodland on the lower hills and valleys. There are three areas of Ancient Semi-Natural Woodland in the Malvern Hills SSSI: Hollybush Roughs between the boundary of Castlemorton Common and the Midsummer Hill fort, Park Wood in West Malvern and an area near Holy Well above Malvern Wells.

Key AONB species include dormouse, barbastelle, skylark, high brown fritillary butterfly, great crested newt, adder and black poplar.

History

Flint axes, arrowheads, and flakes found in the area are attributed to early Bronze Age settlers, and the 'Shire Ditch', a late Bronze Age boundary earthwork possibly dating from around 1000 BC, was constructed along part of the crest of the hills near the site of later settlements. The Wyche Cutting, a mountain pass through the hills was in use in prehistoric times as part of the salt route from Droitwich to South Wales. A 19th-century discovery of over two hundred metal money bars suggests that the area had been inhabited by the La Tène people around 250 BC. Ancient folklore has it that the British chieftain Caractacus made his last stand against the Romans at the British Camp, a site of extensive Iron Age earthworks on a summit of the Malvern Hills close to where Malvern was to be later established. The story remains disputed, however, as Roman historian Tacitus implies a site closer to the river Severn. There is therefore no evidence that Roman presence ended the prehistoric settlement at British Camp. However, excavations at nearby Midsummer Hillfort, Bredon Hill and Croft Ambrey all show evidence of violent destruction around the year 48 AD. This may suggest that the British Camp was abandoned or destroyed around the same time.

During the medieval period, the hills and surrounding area were part of a royal forest known as Malvern Chase. Riots by commoners and legal challenges from land owners ensued when King Charles I attempted to disafforest the Chase in 1630. Ultimately, only one third was disafforested, and commissioners were appointed to ensure any further encroachments did not leave the common lands as the most meagre in quality. This system lasted until the 1800s.

In 1884, the Malvern Hills Conservators were established through an Act of Parliament to preserve the natural aspect of the hills and protect them from encroachments. However, by this time large-scale quarrying had already begun. Quarry works were set in motion in the 1870s at Tank Quarry and at Little Malvern by Pyx Granite Company. The Hills Conservators lobbied parliament to pass an Act limiting the exploitation, and although a second Act was passed in 1924 its provisions were largely ineffective. Quarrying continued until 1966. The landscape itself was irrevocably changed; but there is some debate whether this has enriched or damaged the ecology of the Hills. Certainly the quarrying has changed the Hills forever, including creating habitats for frogs, toads, newts and other small animals. The new cliffs provide nesting sites for certain birds. The quarries, especially North Quarry and Tank Quarry, have over the years been the sites of several accidents requiring the Emergency Services.

In 1989, the cafe on Worcestershire Beacon burned down. As the Malvern Hills Acts state that no building should be erected on the Conservators' land or on land under their jurisdiction, the Conservators put a bill through Parliament to get the power to build a new one but the House of Lords opposed it. When the cafe was burned down, the Conservators had plans to replace the building but were advised that they risked prosecution for rebuilding as the original cafe building was an encroachment on common land. The Malvern Hills Bill was in preparation to modernise some of the clauses in previous acts a clause was inserted to gain authority to rebuild the cafe.
Five members of the House of Lords Select Committee visited the Malvern Hills and decided that there were enough facilities in the immediate area and that St Ann's Well cafe should be enough provision on the hills, so the application to rebuild was turned down.

In 2000, a £1.3 million project to reintroduce grazing animals to the Malvern Hills and restore part of its historic network of water spouts was given significant backing of National Lottery funds. The Malverns Heritage Project aimed to reintroduce grazing animals as a natural means of scrub management and restore several water features. The project was spearheaded by the Malvern Hills AONB Service, in partnership with Worcestershire County Council, Herefordshire Council, Malvern Hills Conservators, Malvern Spa Association, English Nature, Countryside Agency, National Trust and English Heritage. Members of the public were concerned that by erecting temporary fences on the Malvern Hills the Conservators would be straying from their core duty of keeping the Malvern Hills unenclosed as open spaces for the recreation and enjoyment of the public. Although the conservation officer said any enclosures would be small and temporary there were worries that leisure activities that could be affected and that "the feeling of freedom associated with 'just being' on the Malvern Hills" could be lost.

In 2001, the Malvern Hills were officially closed to the public for the first time in history. Walkers were told to avoid the area as part of the effort to prevent the spread of foot and mouth disease. As a result of the closure the economy of the Malvern Hills faced serious damage. In 2002 the Malvern Hills were named the most popular free tourist attraction in the West Midlands in a survey commissioned by the Countryside Agency to take the temperature of rural tourism in the wake of the crisis.

In 2006, Worcestershire County Council was awarded £770,000 by the Heritage Lottery Fund for restoration work and preservation of the area by fitting cattle grids to roads across the Hills and encouraging local landowners to allow sheep to wander across their land. As part of the Malvern Heritage Project nine water features within the AONB were also renovated.

Governance

The Malvern Hills Trust is the working name for the Malvern Hills Conservators and manages most parts of the Hills and the surrounding Commons, some other parcels of land and many roadside verges. They were established in 1884 and are governed by five Acts of Parliament, the Malvern Hills Acts 1884, 1909, 1924, 1930 and 1995. They are a voluntary body of twenty-nine members. Eleven are directly elected under the Local Elections (Principal areas) Rules by the residents of the wards who contribute to the Conservators' funds through a levy in their Council Tax, seventeen are appointed by local authorities and one by the Church Commissioners.

The Malvern Hills were designated an Area of Outstanding Natural Beauty (AONB) in 1959. The Malvern Hills Conservators played a key role in ensuring that the area of the AONB is larger than that originally proposed.

The AONB Partnership work together to conserve and enhance the Malvern Hills AONB. The Partnership has a formal structure including representatives from private and public enterprises, officers from local authorities, the Countryside Agency and the Malvern Hills Conservators.

Sport, leisure, and tourism

The Malvern Hills are home to a wide range of outdoor sports and leisure activities, including walking, mountain biking, horse riding, orienteering, hang-gliding, paragliding, model aircraft flying, fishing, climbing and diving.

The Worcestershire Way is a waymarked long-distance trail located within the county of Worcestershire. It runs  from Bewdley to Great Malvern. It is an important recreation resource in the AONB.

The route was devised to highlight geology, landscape and associated heritage. The Malvern Hills Geocentre is located halfway along the Geopark Way, at the Wyche. This official visitor centre gives more information on interactive iPads about the geology, nature and history of the Geopark and the Malvern hills and Malvern in particular, as well as large wall maps of the area.

Abberley and Malvern Hills Geopark
The Abberley and Malvern Hills Geopark was launched in 2004. The geological and geomorphological significance of the area has been recognised for many years with 13 Sites of Special Scientific Interest (SSSI) and 179 Local Geological Sites (LGS) present.

Transport

The A449 road runs through the centre of Malvern, connecting it to Worcester and Ledbury. The M5 motorway to the east of Malvern is accessible at junctions 7 and 8. The M50 (also known as the Ross Spur) to the south can be accessed at junction 1 on the A38 road between Tewkesbury and Malvern.

The AONB has four railway stations inside or very close to its boundary: Malvern Link, Great Malvern, Colwall and Ledbury. Direct trains to the area are available from Birmingham Snow Hill or Birmingham New Street and London Paddington.

Several local bus services connect Malvern with the surrounding area. Long-distance direct bus services connect Malvern with other cities in the country, including the National Express route 321 through eleven counties from Aberdare, South Wales, via Birmingham and other major cities to Bradford, West Yorkshire, and route 444 from Worcester to London (Victoria).

Malvern Hills in cultural life

Music

English composer Edward Elgar, who was from the area, often walked, cycled, and reportedly flew kites on these hills. He wrote a cantata in 1898 entitled Caractacus, which alludes to the popular legend of his last stand at British Camp. In 1934, during the composer's final illness, he told a friend: "If ever after I'm dead you hear someone whistling this tune [from his Cello Concerto] on the Malvern Hills, don't be alarmed, it's only me."

Composers Herbert Howells and Ivor Gurney used to take long walks together through the nearby Cotswold Hills and the natural beauty of the area, including the magnificent views of the Malverns, was a profound inspiration for their music. Howells dedicated his first major work, the Piano Quartet in A minor (1916), to "the hill at Chosen (Churchdown) and Ivor Gurney who knew it".

The Swedish singer Jenny Lind spent the last years of her life living at Wynd's Point near the British Camp. She is buried in Great Malvern cemetery.

Literature

The Malvern Hills were the inspiration and setting for the famous 14th-century poem The Visions of Piers Plowman (1362) by William Langland, who was possibly educated at the priory of Great Malvern. The earliest poetical allusion to the Malvern Hills occurs in the poem: "And on a Maye mornynge on Malverne hylles".

The poet W. H. Auden taught for three years at The Downs School, Colwall, in the Malvern Hills. He spent three years at the school in the 1930s and wrote some of his finest early love poems there, including: "This Lunar Beauty"; "Let Your Sleeping Head"; "My Love, Fish in the Unruffled Lakes"; and "Out on the Lawn I Lie in Bed". He also wrote a long poem about the hills and their views, called simply The Malverns.

J.R.R. Tolkien found inspiration in the Malvern landscape which he had viewed from his childhood home in Birmingham and his brother Hilary's home near Evesham. He was introduced to the area by C. S. Lewis, who had brought him here to meet George Sayer, the Head of English at Malvern College. Sayer had been a student of Lewis, and became his biographer, and together with them Tolkien would walk the Malvern Hills. Recordings of Tolkien reading excerpts from The Hobbit and The Lord of the Rings were made in Malvern in 1952, at the home of George Sayer. The recordings were later issued on long-playing gramophone records. In the liner notes for J.R.R. Tolkien Reads and Sings his The Hobbit & The Fellowship of the Ring, George Sayer wrote that Tolkien would relive the book as they walked and compared parts of the Malvern Hills to the White Mountains of Gondor.

The poet Elizabeth Barrett Browning spent her childhood at Hope End, a 500-acre (2.0 km2) estate near the Malvern Hills in Ledbury, Herefordshire. Her time at Hope End would inspire her in later life to write Aurora Leigh.

In Early British Trackways Alfred Watkins theorised that a ley line passed along the Malvern Hills through several wells including St Ann's Well, Holy Well, Walms Well and St. Pewtress Well. Interest in Watkin's theories subsided in the 1930s but saw a revival in the late 1960s. In The Ley Hunter's Companion (1979) Paul Devereux theorised that a 10-mile alignment he called the "Malvern Ley" passed through St Ann's Well, the Wyche Cutting, a section of the Shire Ditch, Midsummer Hill, Whiteleaved Oak, Redmarley D'Abitot and Pauntley. In City of Revelation (1973) British author John Michell theorised that Whiteleaved Oak is the centre of a circular alignment he called the "Circle of Perpetual Choirs" and is equidistant from Glastonbury, Stonehenge, Goring-on-Thames and Llantwit Major. The theory was investigated by the British Society of Dowsers and used as background material by Phil Rickman in his novel The Remains of an Altar (2006).
"Malvern Hills" is the third short story in Japanese-English author Kazuo Ishiguro's collection Nocturnes (2009).

The legend of the Shadow of the Ragged Stone, a shadow appearing to arise from the hilltop under particular meteorological conditions said to bring ill-fortune to those on whom it falls, features in many literary sources. It is the subject of the novel "The Shadow of the Ragged Stone" by Charles F. Grindrod, which tells the story of a monk who in punishment for breaking his vow of chastity was compelled to crawl up the hill every day on his hands and knees, and died cursing the hill and all on whom its shadow should fall.

Art
Paintings of the Malvern Hills include Henry Harris Lines's The British Camp and Herefordshire Beacon (1872), now in the Worcester City Museums.

David Prentice, founder member of Birmingham's Ikon Gallery, has been painting the Malvern Hills since 1986.

Paul Nash made paintings of the hills from 'Madams' in Gloucestershire and from the 'Rising Sun' hotel on Cleeve Hill near Cheltenham.

Dame Laura Knight painted in a studio near Wynds Point below British Camp.

Television

The opening scene in Elgar, a drama documentary made in 1962 by the British director Ken Russell, depicts a young Elgar riding a white pony over the Malvern Hills. Made for BBC Television's long-running Monitor programme, it dramatised the life of the composer Edward Elgar. The film significantly raised the public profile of the composer.

The Tank Quarry on North Hill and West of England Quarry on the Worcestershire Beacon were used as locations in the Doctor Who serial The Krotons, starring Patrick Troughton. The serial was broadcast in four weekly parts from 28 December 1968 to 18 January 1969.

The Malvern Hills are the backdrop for Penda's Fen, a 1974 British television play written by David Rudkin and directed by Alan Clarke for the BBC's Play for Today series. It tells the story of Stephen, a pastor's son who has visions of angels, Edward Elgar, and King Penda, the last pagan ruler of England.
 The final scene of the play, where the protagonist has an apparitional experience of King Penda and the "mother and father of England", is set on the Malvern Hills.

Architecture

A famous historic Virginia Landmark, Malvern Hill was a house built in the 17th century by an English settler, Thomas Cocke, later the site of an American Civil War battle. Cocke named his home after Malvern Hills in England.

The hills

A list of the hills in their order from north to south is shown below:

A good panorama of the length of the hills can be seen from the M5 motorway, particularly between Junction 7 at Worcester (south) and Junction 9 at Tewkesbury.

Vistas
Between 1999 and 2000, the Heart of England Tourist Board carried out a survey of visitors to the Malvern hills on behalf of the Malvern Hills Area of Outstanding Natural Beauty Partnership (AONB). Those questioned indicated that the thing they liked most about the hills was "the scenery and views".

The AONB commissioned study to "identify and assess a selection of key views to and from the Malvern Hills" it was carried out in 2009 by Cooper Partnership Ltd, a firm of Chartered Landscape Architects.
This information was gathered not only so that the best vistas could be made known to a wider public, but also as an intelligence gathering so that proposed changes to the landscape both in and outside the Malvern Hills area of outstanding beauty (such as the building of wind turbines) could be assessed against the impact those developments would have on the Malvern Hills area of outstanding beauty.
The Cooper Partnership identified 50 key views from vantage points on the Malvern hills, and from the surrounding area. These were:

See also
Malvern
Great Malvern
Malvern Hills Conservators
Areas of Outstanding Natural Beauty in England
List of Sites of Special Scientific Interest in Herefordshire
List of Sites of Special Scientific Interest in Worcestershire
List of Sites of Special Scientific Interest in Gloucestershire
Malvern Hills District Council

References

External links

Malvern Hills Conservators
Walking the Malverns
Malvern Hills AONB Website
Abberley and Malvern Hills Geopark
Malvern Hills Trail
Geology of the Malvern Hills
Google Map of the springs and fountains of the Malvern Hills
Natural England (SSSI general information)

 
Hills of Worcestershire
Hills of Herefordshire
Hills of Gloucestershire
Areas of Outstanding Natural Beauty in England
Tourist attractions in Worcestershire
Tourist attractions in Herefordshire
Malvern, Worcestershire
Protected areas of Worcestershire
Protected areas of Herefordshire
Protected areas of Gloucestershire
Sites of Special Scientific Interest in Herefordshire
Sites of Special Scientific Interest in Worcestershire
Sites of Special Scientific Interest in Gloucestershire
Sites of Special Scientific Interest notified in 1954
Natural regions of England